Time-out, Time Out,  or timeout may refer to:

Time
 Time-out (sport), in various sports, a break in play, called by a team
 Television timeout, a break in sporting action so that a commercial break may be taken
 Timeout (computing), an engineering concept
 Time-out (parenting), a parental technique for disciplining a child

Arts
 Time Out (magazine), weekly listing magazines for various world cities, also the British publishing company
 Time Out (drama)
 "Timeout", an episode of the animated television series Mona the Vampire
 Time Out (TV series), an Australian television series which aired 1963

Music
 Time Out (album), a 1959 jazz album by the Dave Brubeck Quartet
 "Mixtape: Time Out", a 2022 song by Stray Kids
 "Time Out", a 1974 song by Joe Walsh from So What
 "Time Out", a 2005 song by Edan from Beauty and the Beat
 "Time Out", a 2007 song by Hiromi from Time Control

Film
 Time Out (1984 film), an Estonian animated short film
 Time Out (1998 film) or Golpe de estadio, a Colombian film
 Time Out (2001 film) or l'Emploi du temps, a French film
 Time Out (2015 film), a Bollywood film

Other uses
 Timeout (mascot), the costumed mascot of California State University, Fresno
 Time Out (chocolate bar), a brand of chocolate bar made by Cadbury
 Time Out Group, a digital and print events and entertainment company

See also
 Time Out for Smokey Robinson & The Miracles, a 1969 Motown album
 Time Out with Britney Spears, a 1999 music DVD